Lithophragma is a genus of flowering plants in the saxifrage family containing about nine species native to western North America. These plants are known generally as woodland stars. The petals of the flowers are usually bright white with deep, long lobes or teeth. Each petal may look like three to five petals, when at closer inspection the lobes fuse into a single petal at its base. Most species reproduce via bulblets instead of seeds. L. maximum is a federally listed endangered species. Lithophragma specifically coevolved with moths of the genus Greya, who pollinate and only lay eggs on Lithophragma plants.

Species
There are 9 species. The Flora of North America North of Mexico counts 10 species, elevating L. parviflorum var. trifoliatum to species status, but the Jepson Manual considers it to be a variety of L. parviflorum  restricted to California.
 
Lithophragma affine - San Francisco woodland star
Lithophragma bolanderi - Bolander's woodland star
Lithophragma campanulatum - Siskiyou Mountain woodland star
Lithophragma cymbalaria - mission woodland star
Lithophragma glabrum - bulbous woodland star
Lithophragma heterophyllum - hillside woodland star
Lithophragma maximum - San Clemente Island woodland star
Lithophragma parviflorum - smallflower woodland star
Lithophragma tenellum - slender woodland star

References

External links
Jepson Manual Treatment

 
Saxifragaceae genera